Ashiyana  (English: Beautiful Home) (Urdu : ﺁشيانه) is a 1997 Pakistani drama series which was aired on the Pakistan Television network in 1997. The Story is about orphan siblings and the challenges they face in their life. Despite all their struggles they manage to make their home into a house full of love and life.
The series also highlighted the struggle between those living in rural Pakistan who wish to emigrate abroad in the desire for a better life.

Cast 
Qavi Khan as Wajid Khan
Irfan Khoosat as Chaudhary Rehmat
Waseem Abbas as Nouman
Seemi Zaidi as Sapna
Maria Wasti as Saima
Nighat Butt as Zarda
M. Zubair as Bhai Uncle
Javed Kodu as Babu
Kashif Mehmood as Saif
Shazib Mirza as Chaudhary Nazeer
Sanam Nazi as Babi Aunty
Aamna Ahmed as Narmeen
Mahazaib as Billo
Zia Khan as Sajid
Azhar Zaheer as Waqar Uncle
Amanat Chann as Chand
Chacha Tufail as Chacha Karmo
Atiq as Atiq
Tahir Noushad as Rafiq
Touqeer Ahmed as Dumb Man
Imran Islam as Aamir
Atif Mehmood as Bantoo
Semal Rehan as Gurya
Furqan Latif as Waleed
Nadia Saeed as Alia
Najma Wasti as Raheela
Abdulla as Jabbar Mechanic
Anita Kamfiar as Aya Amma
Rage music band
Salman
Ali
Cristopher
Ahmer

References

Pakistani drama television series
Urdu-language television shows
Pakistan Television Corporation original programming
Television shows set in Quetta
Pakistani action television series